Rasmus Steensbæk Lauritsen (born 27 February 1996) is a Danish footballer who plays as a centre back for Danish Superliga side Brøndby IF.

Career
Lauritsen has both played for Herning Fremad and Brande IF as a youth player, starting as a four-year-old, before joining Midtjylland in the summer 2011.

At the age of 19, Lauritsen made his professional debut for Midtjylland on 8 November 2015, in a Superliga game against Esbjerg.

Skive
On 5 January 2016 Danish 1st Division side Skive confirmed, that they had signed Lauritsen on a two-year contract.

Vejle
Lauritsen signed for Vejle on 9 June 2017 for two years. A few months later the club extended Lauritsen's contract for one more year.

Norrköping
On 11 February 2019, Lauritsen moved abroad and signed for Swedish top club Norrköping on a three-year deal.

Dinamo Zagreb
On 2 October 2020, Lauritsen signed for Croatian champions Dinamo Zagreb. He debuted two days later against Varaždin and made an error that resulted in a goal. However, his performances soon drastically improved and had an instant impact on Dinamo's defense, causing them not to concede a single goal in all five Europa League group stage games that he played.

Brøndby IF
On 30 January 2023, Lauritsen returned to his native Denmark to join Brøndby IF on a four-and-a-half year contract.

Personal life
Lauritsen has a twin brother, Frederik, who also plays football.

His favourite player is Andy Carroll and his favourite team is Arsenal.

Career statistics

Honours

Midtjylland
Danish Superliga: 2014–15

Dinamo Zagreb
Prva HNL: 2020–21
Croatian Cup: 2020–21

References

External links
 

1996 births
Living people
Danish twins
Twin sportspeople
Danish men's footballers
Danish expatriate men's footballers
Danish Superliga players
Danish 1st Division players
Allsvenskan players
Croatian Football League players
FC Midtjylland players
Skive IK players
Vejle Boldklub players
IFK Norrköping players
GNK Dinamo Zagreb players
Brøndby IF players
Association football defenders
Danish expatriate sportspeople in Sweden
Danish expatriate sportspeople in Croatia
Expatriate footballers in Sweden
Expatriate footballers in Croatia
People from Ikast-Brande Municipality
Sportspeople from the Central Denmark Region